Zakariae Derhem (born 9 October 1990) is a Moroccan Paralympic athlete. He won the gold medal in the men's shot put F33 event at the 2020 Summer Paralympics held in Tokyo, Japan.

References

External links
 

Living people
1990 births
People from Fez, Morocco
Moroccan male shot putters
Athletes (track and field) at the 2020 Summer Paralympics
Medalists at the 2020 Summer Paralympics
Paralympic gold medalists for Morocco
Paralympic medalists in athletics (track and field)
Paralympic athletes of Morocco